The Robert Louis-Dreyfus Trophy (French: Trophée Robert Louis-Dreyfus) was a summer tournament hosted by Olympique de Marseille in dedication to Robert Louis-Dreyfus, a majority shareholder of the French football team, who died on July 4, 2009, following a long battle with leukemia.

The inaugural competition took place in 2010 where Marseille were joined by Valencia CF. The second and final edition was played on August 1, 2015, against Juventus. The competition did not take place between 2011 and 2014 because of the ongoing renovations to the Stade Vélodrome. The tournament was discontinued after two editions.

2010 edition
The inaugural edition of the Robert Louis-Dreyfus Trophy was played on August 1, 2010, between hosts Marseille and Valencia who had ended third in the 2009–10 La Liga season. A solitary goal from Hatem Ben Arfa saw Marseille triumph 1–0.

2015 edition
The second edition of the tournament was played on August 1, 2015, a week before the 2015-16 Ligue 1 season began. Marseille hosted reigning Serie A champions and UEFA Champions League runners-up Juventus and won the match 2-0 thanks to goals by Romain Alessandrini and Abdelaziz Barrada.

Titles by team

Goalscorers

References

French football friendly trophies
Juventus F.C.
Olympique de Marseille
2015 disestablishments in France
2010 establishments in France
2010 in French sport
2015 in French sport